The  is a national expressway in Japan. It is owned and operated by East Nippon Expressway Company.

Overview

The name Gaikan refers to the route's status as an outer ring road (beltway) for Tokyo. The expressway is also referred to simply as Gaikan for short. It is the second of three expressway ring routes in the greater Tokyo area: the innermost is the Central Circular Route, then the Gaikan, and the outermost is the Ken-Ō Expressway. The Inner Circular Route of the Shuto Expressway is apparently not considered a true ring road, as the alternate Japanese name of the Ken-Ō Expressway (English name is Metropolitan Inter-City Expressway) is 三環状道路, with the first character meaning 'three' not 'four.'
A section of the expressway on the northern side of the Tokyo area was the first to open to traffic (Ōizumi Junction to Misato-minami Interchange). Most of this section is an elevated roadway built on the median of National Route 298 with curved windbreaks on both sides. Most of the roadway has two lanes in each direction (three lanes from Ōizumi Junction to Wakō-kita Interchange).

The eastern section from Misato to Ichikawa was opened to the public on 2 June 2018, three years after schedule. The western section from Izumi to the Chuo expressway is under construction, while the final section linking to the Tomei expressway is still at the planning stage. The western section will pass through the densely populated suburbs of western Tokyo; large parts of it will consist of tunnels constructed at least 40 m underground (deep underground).

The toll for a regular passenger car is currently 500 yen regardless of the distance travelled. Electronic Toll Collection (ETC) is accepted.

List of interchanges and features

 PA - parking area, TB - toll gate

Gallery

References

External links
 East Nippon Expressway Company
 About the Gaikan (Chiba section)
 Tokyo Ring Step (Tokyo section)

Expressways in Japan
Proposed roads in Japan
Ring roads in Japan
Roads in Chiba Prefecture
Roads in Saitama Prefecture
Roads in Tokyo
1992 establishments in Japan